David Kos "Music Man" Rolfe (born November 23, 1968) is an American singer from New York City who has written and performed five English songs for the Pokémon anime. Rolfe is currently working at the advertising agency BBDO and is still making music as of 2017.

Personal life 
David Rolfe was born in New York on November 23, 1968. He is married and has two children. Rolfe currently still lives in New York and still continues to make music and is working at BBDO New York.

Early on, Rolfe wanted to be a producer and even worked on a film in high school. His first shoot was for an account called "truth," which represented an anti-tobacco initiative for the state of Florida.

Career 
David Rolfe is best known for performing five English openings for Pokémon in addition to playing the guitar in the original Pokémon theme. He was later invited to sing the theme songs for seasons 4, 5, 6, 7, and 8. He left the show when 4Kids Entertainment lost the right to dub the Pokémon anime since he was working under 4Kids at the time. Rolfe and fellow 4Kids colleague John Siegler were unable to move to the company that took over the dub, TAJ Productions. Since then, Rolfe has been working under a record label from Warner Chappell Music and is still working to make music. He is currently working at BBDO as the Director of Integrated Production.

Awards 
On May 16th of 2017, David Rolfe and Greg Hahn from BBDO New York won the 21st Webby Award for agency of the year.

Filmography
Rolfe has been credited for various films and songs featured under a broad variety of genres.

References

External links 

 David Rolfe at BBDO New York
 
 I'm History
 David Rolfe and Greg Hahn receiving the Webby Ward in 2017

1968 births
Living people
American male singers
Singers from New York City